Amara fusca, sometimes known as the wormwood moonshiner, is a species of ground beetles in the family Carabidae.

Discovery
The species was re-discovered in West Suffolk on September 6, 1993. They can also be found in Crymlyn Burrows on the Glamorgan coast. Before this the species have not been seen in Britain since 1942.

Description
The colour of the beetle is black.

Habitat
The species lives in a vegetated, and dry soil. It also can be found in sandy and gravelly soil, such as headlands and sand dunes. The larva is a predator. Adult beetles prefer the seeds of Artemisia campestris. The species are common in autumn, usually from 6 September  to 13 October. Sometimes they might appear from 15 May to 14 June.

References

fusca
Beetles of Europe
Beetles described in 1828
Taxa named by Pierre François Marie Auguste Dejean